In enzymology, a protein-glucosylgalactosylhydroxylysine glucosidase is an enzyme that catalyzes the chemical reaction

protein alpha-D-glucosyl-1,2-beta-D-galactosyl-L-hydroxylysine + H2O  D-glucose + protein beta-D-galactosyl-L-hydroxylysine

Thus, the two substrates of this enzyme are protein alpha-D-glucosyl-1,2-beta-D-galactosyl-L-hydroxylysine and H2O, whereas its two products are D-glucose and protein beta-D-galactosyl-L-hydroxylysine.

This enzyme belongs to the family of hydrolases, specifically those glycosidases that hydrolyse O- and S-glycosyl compounds.  The systematic name of this enzyme class is protein-alpha-D-glucosyl-1,2-beta-D-galactosyl-L-hydroxylysine glucohydrolase. Other names in common use include 2-O-alpha-D-glucopyranosyl-5-O-alpha-D-galactopyranosylhydroxy-L-, and lysine glucohydrolase.

References

 
 
 

EC 3.2.1
Enzymes of unknown structure